Andrew Campbell Bowie (born 28 May 1987) is a Scottish Conservative Party politician. He has been the Member of Parliament (MP) for West Aberdeenshire and Kincardine since the 2017 general election. He has been serving as Parliamentary Under-Secretary of State for Exports since February 2023.

Early life and education 
Bowie was born in Arbroath and educated at Inverurie Academy in Aberdeenshire. While studying at Inverurie Academy, Bowie was chosen to join the National Youth Orchestra of Scotland, playing the violin. After leaving school, he joined the Royal Navy and attended Britannia Royal Naval College before serving as an officer, achieving the rank of Sub-Lieutenant. After leaving the Navy, Bowie studied History and Politics at the University of Aberdeen, where he was a member of the Aberdeen University Royal Naval Unit and where he was elected Chairman of the University of Aberdeen Conservative and Unionist Association for the 2012/13 academic year.

Career

Early career 
After graduating from the University of Aberdeen, Bowie was employed as a Military Projects Coordinator for Westhill-based diving equipment supplier Divex. Bowie left Divex in January 2014 to assume a post as the North Scotland Campaign Manager for the Scottish Conservative and Unionist Party, and was seconded to the Better Together campaign for the duration of the 2014 Scottish Independence Referendum. Following the referendum, Bowie transitioned to parliamentary politics by serving as a senior advisor to the Conservative MEP for Scotland Ian Duncan MEP. In 2016, following the Scottish Parliament election, 2016, Bowie was hired as office manager to Liam Kerr MSP, who was elected as the Scottish Conservative and Unionist Member of the Scottish Parliament for the North East Scotland region.

Parliamentary career 
Bowie was elected as an MP in June 2017, with a majority of 7,950 votes. From October that year until June 2018, he was a member of the Work and Pensions Select Committee.

In February 2018, Bowie was appointed Parliamentary Private Secretary (PPS) to the Department for Digital, Culture, Media and Sport under Matt Hancock, and later under Jeremy Wright.

In December 2018, he was promoted to Parliamentary Private Secretary to the Prime Minister by Theresa May until her resignation in July 2019.

In July 2019, Bowie was appointed as one of six Vice Chairmen of the Conservative Party and is responsible for the Young Conservatives.

Bowie was re-elected as the MP for West Aberdeenshire & Kincardine at the 2019 general election, with a significantly reduced majority of 843 votes.

In November 2021, Bowie announced he would resign as a Vice Chairman of the Conservative Party once a replacement was selected, soon after the forced resignation of Owen Paterson from the party, giving the reason "to focus on representing my constituents in West Aberdeenshire and Kincardine".

He is an advocate of the Down Syndrome Bill, which would recognise people with Down syndrome as a specific minority group.

In March 2022, Bowie was elected as the Chairman of the Union 1922 Backbench Policy Committee.

Electoral history

Personal life
He is married to Madeleine Clarke.

References

External links

1987 births
Living people
Alumni of the University of Aberdeen
People educated at Inverurie Academy
People from Arbroath
Royal Navy officers
Parliamentary Private Secretaries to the Prime Minister
Scottish Conservative Party MPs
UK MPs 2017–2019
UK MPs 2019–present